All the King's Men is a 1949 American drama written, produced, and directed by Robert Rossen. It is based on the 1946 Robert Penn Warren novel of the same name. The film stars Broderick Crawford, John Ireland, Mercedes McCambridge, and Joanne Dru. The plot focuses on the rise and fall of the ambitious and ruthless politician Willie Stark (Crawford) in the American South. Though a fictional character, Stark strongly resembles Louisiana governor Huey Long.

The film won three Academy Awards, including the Academy Award for Best Picture, the award for Best Actor, which went to Broderick Crawford, and the award for Best Supporting Actress, won by Mercedes McCambridge.

In 2001, All the King's Men was deemed "culturally, historically, or aesthetically significant" by the Library of Congress and was selected for preservation in the United States National Film Registry.

Plot
The rise of Willie Stark from a rural county seat to the governor's mansion is depicted in the film. He goes into politics, railing against the corruptly run county government, but loses his race for county treasurer in the face of obstacles placed by the local machine. Stark teaches himself law and continues to fight the establishment, championing the local people and gaining popularity. He eventually becomes a candidate for governor, narrowly losing his first race, then winning on his second attempt. Along the way he becomes as corrupt as the politicians he once fought against.  As he rises, Stark philanders and gets involved with many women, taking his PR man/journalist Jack Burden's own girlfriend, Anne Stanton, as his mistress.

Stark's son Tommy drinks to deal with his feelings about his father and crashes his car, injuring himself and killing his female passenger. When Stark bullies Tommy into playing a football game, Tommy becomes paralyzed after a brutal hit.

Stark, who had always dealt with those who got in his way by any means, begins to see his world unravel and he discovers that not everyone can be bought off.

The story has a complex series of relationships, seen through the eyes of the journalist Jack Burden, who admires Stark and even when disillusioned still sticks by him. Stark's campaign assistant Sadie is clearly in love with Stark and wants him to leave his wife, Lucy. When Stark's reputation is brought into disrepute by Judge Stanton (Anne's uncle), he seeks to blacken the judge's name. When Jack finds evidence of the judge's possible wrongdoing a quarter century earlier, he hides it from Stark. Anne gives the evidence to Stark, who uses it against her uncle, and he commits suicide. Anne seems to forgive Stark, but her brother Adam, the surgeon who helped save Tommy's life after the car crash, cannot. After Stark blocks an impeachment investigation, Adam assassinates Stark. The doctor in turn is shot down by Sugar Boy, Stark's assistant. Having lost his respect for Stark, Jack tries to get Anne's agreement to find a way to destroy Stark's reputation just as he dies.

Cast

 Broderick Crawford as Willie Stark
 John Ireland as Jack Burden
 Joanne Dru as Anne Stanton
 John Derek as Tom Stark
 Mercedes McCambridge as Sadie Burke
 Shepperd Strudwick as Adam Stanton
 Ralph Dumke as Tiny Duffy
 Anne Seymour as Mrs. Lucy Stark
 Katharine Warren as Mrs. Burden
 Raymond Greenleaf as Judge Monte Stanton
 Walter Burke as Sugar Boy
 Will Wright as Dolph Pillsbury
 Grandon Rhodes as Floyd McEvoy
 Larry Steers as Man at Impeachment Hearing (uncredited)
 Houseley Stevenson as Madison the newspaper editor 
 Paul Ford as State Senator and impeachment prosecutor

Production
Rossen originally offered the starring role to John Wayne, who found the proposed film script unpatriotic and indignantly refused the part. Crawford, who eventually took the role, won the 1949 Academy Award for Best Actor, beating out Wayne, who had been nominated for his role in Sands of Iwo Jima.

The film was shot at various locations in California using local residents, something that was fairly unknown for Hollywood at the time. The old San Joaquin County courthouse in Stockton, built in 1898 and demolished about a dozen years after the film's release, was featured prominently.

Paul Tatara, a film reviewer for CNN, describes the film as "one of those pictures that was saved in the editing". Al Clark did the original cut but had trouble putting all the footage that Robert Rossen had shot into a coherent narrative. Robert Parrish was brought on board by Rossen and Columbia Studios head Harry Cohn to see what he could do. Since Rossen had a hard time cutting anything he shot, after several weeks of tinkering and cutting the movie was still over 250 minutes long. Cohn was prepared to release it in this version after one more preview, but this threw Rossen into a panic, so Rossen came up with a novel solution. Rossen told Parrish to "[s]elect what you consider to be the center of each scene, put the film in the synch machine and wind down a hundred feet [around 50 seconds] before and a hundred feet after, and chop it off, regardless of what's going on. Cut through dialogue, music, anything. Then, when you're finished, we'll run the picture and see what we've got". When Parrish was done with what Rossen had suggested, they were left with a 109-minute movie that was more compelling to watch. After All the King's Men won its Academy Award for Best Picture, Harry Cohn repeatedly gave Parrish credit for saving the film, even though Parrish only did what Rossen told him to do. The editing gambit gives the film a memorably jagged urgency that is unique for a studio-era film. Although Clark is credited as the "Film Editor" (with Parrish being credited as "Editorial Advisor"), both Clark and Parrish received a nomination for an Academy Award for Best Film Editing.

Reception

Critical response
The film received wide acclaim upon its release. Film critic Bosley Crowther lauded the film and its direction in his review, writing, "Robert Rossen has written and directed, as well as personally produced, a rip-roaring film of the same title ... We have carefully used that descriptive as the tag for this new Columbia film because a quality of turbulence and vitality is the one that it most fully demonstrates ... In short, Mr. Rossen has assembled in this starkly unprettified film a piece of pictorial journalism that is remarkable for its brilliant parts." Critic William Brogdon, writing for Variety magazine, was also complimentary and praised Broderick Crawford's work, "As the rural Abe Lincoln, springing up from the soil to make himself a great man by using the opinionless, follow-the-leader instinct of the more common voter, Broderick Crawford does a standout performance. Given a meaty part, his histrionic bent wraps it up for a great personal success adding much to the many worthwhile aspects of the drama."

On Rotten Tomatoes, All the King's Men holds a rating of 97% based on 70 reviews, with an average rating of 8.10/10. The consensus summarizes: "Broderick Crawford is spellbinding as politician Willie Stark in director Robert Rossen's adaptation of the Robert Penn Warren novel about the corrosive effects of power on the human soul."

Noir analysis
Film historian Spencer Selby calls the film "[A] hard-hitting noir adaptation of Warren's eloquent novel".

Joe Goldberg, film historian and former story editor for Paramount Pictures, wrote about the content of the plot and its noirish fatalistic conclusion, "The plot makes sense, the dialogue is memorable, the story arises from the passions and ideas of the characters. It deals with graft, corruption, love, drink and betrayal, and the subversion of idealism by power, and it might even make someone angry... The story moves toward its conclusion with the dark inevitability of film noir."

Accolades
In 2001, the film was selected for preservation in the United States National Film Registry by the Library of Congress as being "culturally, historically, or aesthetically significant". The Academy Film Archive preserved All the King's Men in 2000. , it is the last Best Picture winner to be based on a Pulitzer Prize-winning novel.

Academy Awards 1949
All the King's Men received  seven Academy Awards nominations, winning three.

See also
 List of American films of 1949
 All the King's Men (2006 film, directed by Steven Zaillian and also based on Warren's book)
 Politics in fiction

References

Notes

Bibliography
Silver, Alain and James Ursini (editors). Film Noir: Reader 2. All the King's Men film noir themes discussed in essay, "Violence and the Bitch Goddess" by Stephen Farber, pgs. 54-55 (1974). Proscenium Publishers, Inc., New York (July 2003). Second Limelight Edition. .

External links

 
 
 
 
 
 All the King's Men information site and DVD review at DVD Beaver (includes images)
 
 All the President's Men essay by Daniel Eagan in America's Film Legacy: The Authoritative Guide to the Landmark Movies in the National Film Registry, A&C Black, 2010 , pages 428–429.

Streaming audio
 All The King's Men on NBC University Theater: January 16, 1949

1949 films
1949 drama films
American political drama films
Best Drama Picture Golden Globe winners
Best Picture Academy Award winners
American black-and-white films
Columbia Pictures films
1940s English-language films
Film noir
Films à clef
Films about elections
Films about politicians
Films based on American novels
Films directed by Robert Rossen
Films featuring a Best Actor Academy Award-winning performance
Films featuring a Best Drama Actor Golden Globe winning performance
Films featuring a Best Supporting Actress Academy Award-winning performance
Films featuring a Best Supporting Actress Golden Globe-winning performance
Films whose director won the Best Director Golden Globe
Films with screenplays by Robert Rossen
United States National Film Registry films
Huey Long
1940s American films